Mollakənd or Mollakend or Mollakent may refer to:
Mollakənd, Kurdamir, Azerbaijan
Mollakənd, Lankaran, Azerbaijan